Brigitta Lehmann (born 24 October 1966) is a German gymnast. She competed in six events at the 1984 Summer Olympics.

References

1966 births
Living people
German female artistic gymnasts
Olympic gymnasts of West Germany
Gymnasts at the 1984 Summer Olympics
Gymnasts from Berlin